Andy Milne (born January 30, 1969) is a Canadian jazz pianist, who records and performs both as a solo artist and as the leader of the ensemble Dapp Theory. He was born in Hamilton, Ontario, and raised in Kincardine and Toronto. One of ten siblings, he studied music at York University, where he was a student of Oscar Peterson.

In 1990 Milne graduated and received a grant from the Canada Council to study at the Banff Centre for the Fine Arts. He met saxophonist Steve Coleman and later joined Coleman's band, Five Elements. In 1998, Milne formed the band Cosmic Dapp Theory.

He has toured and recorded with Ravi Coltrane, Grégoire Maret, Sean Rickman, and Ralph Alessi.

His 2018 album The Seasons of Being won the Juno Award for Jazz Album of the Year – Group at the Juno Awards of 2019.

Awards and honors 
 Voted Rising Star Keyboardist, Down Beat magazine, 2004
 New Works Commission grant and French-America Jazz Exchange grant, Chamber Music America, 2006

Discography 

With Ralph Alessi
 Look (Between the Lines, 2006)
 Cognitive Dissonance (CAM Jazz, 2010)
 Wiry Strong (Clean Feed, 2011)
 Imaginary Friends (ECM, 2019)
With Bruce Cockburn
 You've Never Seen Everything (True North/Rounder, 2003)
With Steve Coleman
 Drop Kick (Novus, 1992)
 The Tao of Mad Phat (Novus, 1993)
 A Tale of 3 Cities (Novus, 1994)
 Curves of Life (BMG France, 1995)
 Def Trance Beat (Modalities of Rhythm) (BMG France, 1995)
 Myths, Modes and Means (BMG France, 1995)
 The Way of the Cipher (BMG France, 1995)
 The Sign and the Seal (BMG France, 1996)
 Genesis / The Opening of the Way (BMG France/RCA Victor, 1997)
 Resistance Is Futile (Label Bleu, 2001)
With Ravi Coltrane
 From the Round Box (BMG France, 2000)
 Mad 6 (Eighty-Eight's/Columbia, 2002)
With Carla Cook
 It's All About Love (Maxjazz, 1999)
With Ranee Lee
 Jazz on Broadway (Justin Time, 1992)
With Hugh Marsh
 Hugmars (Cool Papa, 2007)
With M-Base Collective
 Anatomy of a Groove (DIW, 1992)
With Diederik Rijpstra
 The Living City (TryTone, 2013)
With Carlos Ward
 Set for 2 Dons – Vol. 1 (Peull, 1999)
With Jeremy Warren
 I Can Do All Things

References

External links
 Official Website
 Official site of Andy Milne's band Dapp Theory

Date of birth missing (living people)
1969 births
Living people
Black Canadian musicians
Canadian jazz pianists
Musicians from Hamilton, Ontario
Musicians from Toronto
Canadian jazz composers
Male jazz composers
Canadian male pianists
21st-century Canadian pianists
21st-century Canadian male musicians
Juno Award winners